Orange Sport (formerly Dolce Sport and Telekom Sport) is a Romanian sports television, launched on 13 August 2010, available only on the Orange TV platform. It is offered as a set of sports channels, called Orange Sport 1, Orange Sport 2, Orange Sport 3 and Orange Sport 4.

Sport competitions

Liga I
Liga II
Cupa României
Supercupa României
UEFA Champions League
UEFA Europa League
UEFA Europa Conference League
UEFA Super Cup
UEFA Youth League
Premier League
La Liga
La Liga 2
Copa del Rey
Serie A
Ligue 1
Bundesliga
DFB-Pokal
 Formula One	
 Formula Two	
 Formula Three	
 Porsche Supercup	
 WRC		
 NBA	
UEFA Futsal Champions League
Six Nations
 World Men's Handball Championship	
 World Women's Handball Championship	
European Men's Handball Championship
European Women's Handball Championship
EHF Champions League
EHF European League
EHF European Cup
Women's EHF Champions League
Women's EHF European League
Women's EHF European Cup

References

External links
 Official website

Television stations in Romania
Television channels and stations established in 2020
Sports television in Romania